Excepting those of the Europe-wide safety assessment programme Euro NCAP, vehicle segments in Europe do not have formal characterization or regulations. Although the definition is vague, there is little overlap between segments A–F based on weight and size parameters.

Models segments tend to be based on comparison to well-known brand models. For example, a car such as the Volkswagen Golf might be described as being in the Ford Focus size class, or vice versa. The VW Polo is smaller, so it belongs one segment below the Golf, while the bigger Passat is one segment above.

The names of the segments were mentioned, but not defined, in 1999 in an EU document titled Case No COMP/M.1406 HYUNDAI / KIA REGULATION (EEC) No 4064/89 MERGER PROCEDURE.

See also 
 ACRISS Car Classification Code
 Car body style
 Car classification
 Truck classification
 Vehicle size class

References